The Women's 50 metre freestyle S13 swimming event at the 2004 Summer Paralympics was competed on 27 September. It was won by Kirby Cote, representing .

1st round

Heat 1
27 Sept. 2004, morning session

Heat 2
27 Sept. 2004, morning session

Final round

27 Sept. 2004, evening session

References

W
2004 in women's swimming